James Alfie Jones (born February 6, 1969) is a former American football defensive tackle in the National Football League (NFL). He played college football at Northern Iowa, then he played ten professional seasons as a defensive tackle for four teams from 1991 to 2000. Jones never missed a game in his 10-year career.

References

1969 births
Living people
Sportspeople from Davenport, Iowa
American football defensive ends
American football defensive tackles
Northern Iowa Panthers football players
Cleveland Browns players
Denver Broncos players
Baltimore Ravens players
Detroit Lions players
Players of American football from Iowa
Ed Block Courage Award recipients